The 2016 African-American Film Critics Association Awards were announced on December 13, 2016, while the ceremony took place on February 8, 2017 at Taglyan Complex, in Hollywood, California.

Awards
Below is the list of complete winners.

AAFCA Top Ten Films
 Moonlight (A24)
 Fences (Paramount Pictures)
 Hidden Figures (20th Century Fox)
 Lion (The Weinstein Company)  
 La La Land (Lionsgate)
 The Birth of a Nation (Fox Searchlight)  
 Loving (Focus Features)
 Manchester by the Sea (Roadside Attractions/Amazon Studios)
 Hell or High Water (Lionsgate/CBS Films)
 Queen of Katwe (Walt Disney Pictures/CBS Films)

AAFCA Top Ten TV Shows
 Queen Sugar (OWN)
 Underground (WGN)
 Atlanta (FX)
 Insecure (HBO)  
 Luke Cage (Netflix)
 This Is Us (NBC)  
 Black-ish (ABC)
 The Get Down (Netflix)
 Westworld (HBO)
 Survivor's Remorse (Starz)

AAFCA Regular Awards
 Best Picture
 Moonlight

 Best Director
 Barry Jenkins – Moonlight

 Best Actor
 Denzel Washington – Fences

 Best Actress
 Ruth Negga – Loving

 Best Supporting Actor
 Mahershala Ali – Moonlight

 Best Supporting Actress
 Viola Davis – Fences

 Best Ensemble
 Hidden Figures

 Best Independent Film
 Moonlight

 Best Screenplay
 August Wilson – Fences

 Breakout Performance
 Janelle Monáe – Moonlight and Hidden Figures

 Best Animation
 Zootopia

 Best Documentary
 13th

 Best Song
 "Victory" – Hidden Figures

 Best TV Comedy
 Atlanta

 Best TV Drama
 Queen Sugar

 Best Cable/New Media TV Show
 Underground

 Best Limited Series/Special
 Lemonade

AAFCA Special Awards

 AAFCA Special Achievement Award
 Anthony Hemingway, director; Lee Daniels, producer/director; Floyd Norman, animator
 Roger Ebert Award
 Michael Phillips, film critic
 Ashley Boone Award
 Vanessa Morrison, 20th Century Fox Animation president

See also
2016 in film

References

African-American Film Critics Association Awards
2016 film awards